Gian Luigi Macina (born 17 December 1963) is a Sammarinese long-distance runner. He competed in the men's marathon at the 1992 Summer Olympics and the 2000 Summer Olympics.

References

1963 births
Living people
Athletes (track and field) at the 1992 Summer Olympics
Athletes (track and field) at the 2000 Summer Olympics
Sammarinese male long-distance runners
Sammarinese male marathon runners
Olympic athletes of San Marino
Place of birth missing (living people)